This is a list of high schools in Tokyo Metropolis, including the 23 special wards, West Tokyo, and the Tokyo Islands (Izu Islands and Ogasawara Subprefecture).

National
 
 
 
 

 
 

  -  See Colleges of technology in Japan (which have students ages 15 and older)

Metropolitan
All are operated by the Tokyo Metropolitan Government Board of Education.
 Adachi Senior High School
 Adachi Nishi Senior High School
 Adachi Shinden Senior High School
 Akirudai Senior High School
 Asuka Senior High School
 Chihaya Senior High School
 Denen Chofu Senior High School
 Fuchie Senior High School
 Fuchu Senior High School
 Fuchu Nishi High School
 Fuji Senior High School
 Hachioji Higashi High School
 Hakuo Senior High School
 Harumi Sogo Senior High School
 Hibiya Senior High School
 Hino Senior High School
 Hinodai Senior High School
 Hiroo Senior High School
 Igusa Senior High School
 Jindai Senior High School
 Johtoh Senior High School
 Kamata Senior High School
 Kasai Minami Senior High School
 Kirigaoka Senior High School
 Kitatama Senior High School
 Kiyose Higashi High School
 Koganei Kita Senior High School
 Koishikawa Senior High School
 Koiwa Senior High School
 Kokusai Senior High School
 Komae Senior High School
 Koyamadai Senior High School
 
 Kunitachi Senior High School
 Kurume Senior High School
 Machida Senior High School
 Matsubara Senior High School
 Matsugaya Senior High School
 Meguro Senior High School
 Minami Senior High School
 Minami Tama Senior High School
 Mita Senior High School
 (東京都立三鷹中等教育学校) 
 Mizuho Nōgei High School
 Mizumoto Senior High School
 Mukogaoka Senior High School
 Musashi Senior High School
 Musashigaoka Senior High School
 Musashino Kita Senior High School
 Musashi Murayama Senior High School
 Nagayama Senior High School
 Nihonbashi Senior High School
 Nishi Senior High School
 Ogawa Senior High School
 Ome Higashi Senior High School
 Omori Senior High School
 Ōshūkan Secondary School
 Oyama Senior High School
 Roka Senior High School
 
 Sakuramachi Senior High School
 Shakuji Senior High School
 Shimura Senior High School
 Shinjuku Senior High School
 Showa Senior High School
 Suginami Sogo Senior High School
 Sunagawa Senior High School
 Tachikawa Senior High School
 Tadao Senior High School
 Tagara Senior High School
 Takashima Senior High School
 Takehaya Senior High School
 Tama Senior High School
 Tanashi Senior High School
 Toyama Senior High School
 Tsubasa Sogo Senior High School
 Ueno Senior High School
 Ueno Shinobugaoka Senior High School
 Yashio Senior High School
 Yukigaya Senior High School
 Akabane Commercial High School
 Arakawa Commercial High School
 Ichigaya Commercial High School
 Shiba Commercial High School
 Ushigome Commercial High School
 Yotsuya Commercial High School
 Hachioji Industrial High School
 Honjo Industrial High School
 Koishikawa Industrial High School
 Kuramae Industrial High School
 Mukojima Industrial High School
 Nakano Industrial High School
 Oji Industrial High School
 Rokugo Industrial High School
 Setagaya Industrial High School
 Adachi Technical High School
Senior High School affiliated to Tokyo Metropolitan University

Municipal

 23 Wards
 Chiyoda
  - Senior high school division

Foreign government-operated
Russian Embassy School in Tokyo
 Yokota High School (DoDEA)

Private

 
 American School in Japan (Senior high school division)
 Aoba-Japan International School (high school division)
 Azabu Junior & Senior High School
 British School of Tokyo (Secondary school/sixth form divisions)
 affiliated to the Bunkyo University
 Canadian International School (Senior high school division)
Tokyo Chinese School (Senior high school division)

 Christian Academy in Japan
 
 

 
 Lycée Français International de Tokyo (Senior high school division)
 
 

 Global Indian International School, Tokyo Campus (Senior high school division)
 Gyosei Junior and Senior High School
Horikoshi High School
 
  - Has coeducational and girls' only sections

International Christian University High School 
 International School of the Sacred Heart (junior high school division)
 
  - Separate junior-senior high schools for female and male students

 Joshi Seigakuin Junior & Senior High School
Joshibi High School of Art and Design
 
 
 K. International School Tokyo (Senior high school division)
 
 Kaisei Junior & Senior High School

  (junior and senior high school)
Kikokushijo Academy International School
 

Komaba Toho High School

 Tokyo Korean School (Senior high division)
 Tokyo Korean Junior and Senior High School
 
, affiliated with Kyoritsu Women's University
 
 
 

 
 

 Musashi International School Tokyo (formerly Little Angels International School) (Senior high division)
 Musashi Junior and Senior High School
 
 
 (plans to become coeducational in 2023, with the new name Shinagawa Gakugei High School (品川学藝高等学校))
 
 
  - Junior and senior high school
Oin Gakuen 
 
, affiliated with Otsuma Women's University
  - Girls' school
 Rikkyo Ikebukuro Junior and Senior High School
Sacred Heart School in Tokyo (Senior high school division)
St. Hilda's School
St. Joseph's Junior and Senior High School
 St. Mary's International School (Seniorhigh school division)
 Seigakuin Junior & Senior High School
 
Seisen International School (Senior high school division)

 
 
 

, formerly Ono Gakuen Girls' Junior High and Senior High School (小野学園女子中学・高等学校)
 
, affiliated with Shirayuri Women's University
 Shoei Girls' Junior and Senior High School
Shoin Junior and Senior High School (Tokyo)
 
 Showa Women's University Junior-Senior High School
 
 
 

 
Tamagawa Gakuen 
 

Tōyō Eiwa Jogakuin
 
Tokyo High School
Tokyo Gakuen High School
 
 
 Waseda University Junior and Senior High School
Wako Gakuen High School
, affiliated with Wayo Women's University

Former:
 German School Tokyo (now in Yokohama)

Online
Tokyo Inter-High School

See also
 List of junior high schools in Tokyo
 List of elementary schools in Tokyo

References

High schools